Omegasyrphus coarctatus  , the orange-legged ant fly, is a rare species of syrphid fly observed across the United States.
 Hoverflies can remain nearly motionless in flight. The  adults are also  known as flower flies for they are commonly found on flowers except Microdon species are seldom observed around flowers. Larvae have been found in the nests of the  ant species  Monomorium minutum and Aphaenogaster fulva

References

Diptera of North America
Hoverflies of North America
Microdontinae
Insects described in 1864